John Robert Steel (born October 30, 1948) is an American set theorist at University of California, Berkeley (formerly at UCLA).  He has made many contributions to the theory of inner models and determinacy.  With Donald A. Martin, he proved projective determinacy, assuming the existence of sufficient large cardinals.  He earned his Ph.D. in Logic & the Methodology of Science at Berkeley in 1977 under the joint supervision of John West Addison Jr. and Stephen G. Simpson.

Awards 
In 1988, the Association for Symbolic Logic awarded him, Donald A. Martin and W. Hugh Woodin the Karp Prize for their work on the consistency of determinacy relative to large cardinals. In 2015, the European Set Theory Society awarded him and Ronald Jensen the Hausdorff Medal for their paper "K without the measurable".

In 2012, Steel held the Gödel Lecture titled The hereditarily ordinal definable sets in models of determinacy.

References

External links
 Home page at Berkeley

Living people
20th-century American mathematicians
21st-century American mathematicians
American logicians
Set theorists
University of California, Berkeley alumni
University of California, Berkeley faculty
University of California, Los Angeles faculty
1948 births
Hausdorff Medal winners
Gödel Lecturers